Frederick James Stephens (30 July 1903 – 9 November 1978) was an English oilman who worked for Shell from 1926 to 1971. From 1961 to 1967 Stephens served as the chairman of Shell Transport and Trading.

Biography 
Stephens was born in Bristol on 30 July 1903 to Canon John Frederick Douglas Stephens and Frances Mary Mirrlees. He was educated at Marlborough College (1917–21), the University of Grenoble (1922), and Pembroke College, where in 1926 he graduated Bachelor of Arts. That same year, Stephens joined Shell. He was posted to Venezuela, London, and the United States. In 1946 he assumed the position of vice-president of the Asiatic Petroleum Corporation in New York, which was the American subsidiary of Royal Dutch/Shell's Asiatic Petroleum Company. In 1948 he returned to London. In 1956 he graduated Master of Arts from Cambridge.

Upon his return to England, Stephens received a series of senior postings with Shell. In 1951 he became a director of Shell Transport and Trading, in 1957 the managing director, and in 1961 its chairman. He held the chair until 1967, but remained managing director until his retirement in 1971. In 1951 he also became a director of Royal Dutch Petroleum and from 1956 to 1961 was a principal director. From 1959 to 1961 he was the managing director of the Shell International Petroleum Company.

In 1948 in Dallas, Texas Stephens married Sarah Clark. She died in 1954 and they had no children. Following his retirement, Stephens moved to Jersey and lived at Les Ruisseaux Estate near Saint Brelade. He died on 9 November 1978 at age 75.

References 

British business executives
English businesspeople
Shell plc people